Lyonnaise potatoes – in French pommes de terre sautées à la lyonnaise – are potatoes, boiled and then sliced and shallow-fried, served together with fried onions.

History and ingredients
The culinary term à la lyonnaise –  in the style of Lyon – which is applied to numerous French dishes, generally means that onions are a key part of the recipe. Potatoes à la lyonnaise are sautéed and served with fried onions. All five recipes mentioned below, dating from 1806 to 1970, call for the potatoes to be boiled, peeled and sliced, before frying. 

André Viard, in   Le Cuisinier impérial (1806), stipulates that the potatoes are to be sliced and covered with onion purée before being fried in butter and served with sliced onions that have been gently simmered in water. By the mid-19th century, recipes specified that the onions, as well as the potatoes, should be fried. In Alexis Soyer's recipe (1846) the onions are fried in butter and the sliced boiled potatoes are added to the pan. Soyer adds chopped parsley and lemon juice. 

August Escoffier (1907) recommends frying the potatoes and the onions separately in butter before combining them and sprinkling them with chopped parsley. Marcel Boulestin's recipe (1931) adds the onion raw to the pan in which the potatoes are frying. Elizabeth David (1970) specifies frying the onions first and adding them to the frying potatoes when the latter are very nearly cooked. She recommends either butter or beef dripping for frying both ingredients, and comments that the dish cooked in this way "bears little resemblance ... to the greasy mixture of unevenly browned potatoes and frizzled onions which usually passes for pommes lyonnaises".

Notes

Sources

See also
 Gratin, a  French cooking method often used for potatoes
 Home fries
 Lyonnaise cuisine
 List of potato dishes
 Rappie pie, the French-Canadian casserole made with shredded potatoes
 Sauce lyonnaise
 

Potato dishes
French cuisine
Cuisine of Lyon